Liezel Huber and Lisa Raymond were the defending champions but lost to Hsieh Su-wei and Anabel Medina Garrigues in the third round.

Kim Clijsters played her last women's doubles match before retiring at these championships. Playing with Kirsten Flipkens, she lost to Zhang Shuai and Chuang Chia-jung in the first round.
Sara Errani and Roberta Vinci defeated Andrea Hlaváčková and Lucie Hradecká 6–4, 6–2 in the final to win the title.

Seeds

Draw

Final rounds

Top half

Section 1

Section 2

Bottom half

Section 3

Section 4

References

External links
2012 US Open – Women's draws and results at the International Tennis Federation

Women's Doubles
US Open - Women's Doubles
US Open (tennis) by year – Women's doubles
2012 in women's tennis
2012 in American women's sports